Haythem Ayouni (born 16 May 1991) is a Tunisian football defender.

References

1991 births
Living people
Tunisian footballers
EO Sidi Bouzid players
JS Kairouan players
Étoile Sportive du Sahel players
Stade Tunisien players
Association football defenders
Tunisian Ligue Professionnelle 1 players